Steven Neil Kaplan (born 1959) is the Neubauer Family Distinguished Service Professor of Entrepreneurship and Finance at the University of Chicago Booth School of Business. He started teaching at the business school in 1988, and was named Neubauer Professor in 1999. He is also the Kessenich Faculty director of the  Polsky Center for Entrepreneurship, at the University.

Early life and education
Kaplan received his AB, summa cum laude, in applied mathematics and economics from Harvard College in 1981 and earned a PhD in business economics from Harvard University in 1988.

Teaching
Kaplan teaches advanced courses in corporate finance and entrepreneurial finance. His areas of expertise are: Venture Capital,  Corporate Governance, Private Equity,  Mergers and Acquisitions, Boards of Directors, and E-Commerce. He was named  one of the top twelve business school teachers in U.S., Business Week, 1994, and  one of the top four business school entrepreneurship professors in U.S., Business Week, 1996.

Professional work
In 2001, he was visiting professor at INSEAD, in Fontainebleau, France.  He is a research associate at the National Bureau of Economic Research,

He is an associate editor, Journal of Financial Economics, European Financial Management.

Personal life
He grew up in Danbury, Connecticut.  In 1989, he married Carol Jane Rubin, the daughter of Louis Rubin, vice president of National Westminster Bank USA, in a ceremony in New York, New York.

Publications
He has published many peer-reviewed papers in the top economics and finance journals. These include:
 “Private Equity Performance: Returns, Persistence and Capital Flows,” with Antoinette Schoar, Journal of Finance, Volume 60, August 2005.
 “Characteristics, Contracts, and Actions: Evidence From Venture Capitalist Analyses,” with Per Strömberg. Journal of Finance, Volume 59, October 2004, 2177-2210.
 “What is the Price of Hubris? Using Takeover Battles to Infer Overpayments and Synergies,” with Pekka Hietala and David T. Robinson, Financial Management, Volume 32, Number 3, Autumn, 2003. Awarded Addison-Wesley Prize for 2nd Best Paper in Autumn, 2002 to Summer, 2004 issues.
 “The State of U.S. Corporate Governance: What’s Right and What’s Wrong?” (with Bengt Holmstrom), Journal of Applied Corporate Finance, Spring 2003, 8-20.
 “Financial Contracting Theory Meets the Real World: Evidence From Venture Capital Contracts,” with Per Strömberg, Review of Economic Studies, Volume 70, April 2003, 281-316.
 “The Effects of Business-to-Business E-Commerce on Transaction Costs,” with Luis Garicano, Journal of Industrial Economics, December, 2001, 463-485.

He is editor of "Mergers and Productivity,"(National Bureau of Economic Research, 2000)

References

External links
 Steven Kaplan's Chicago Booth Web Site
 

University of Chicago faculty
Harvard College alumni
Harvard Business School alumni
21st-century American economists
Living people
1959 births